Kupaikha is a rural locality (a village) in Azletskoye Rural Settlement, Kharovsky District, Vologda Oblast, Russia. The population was 11 as of 2002.

Geography 
Kupaikha is located 51 km northwest of Kharovsk (the district's administrative centre) by road. Krasimikha is the nearest rural locality.

References 

Rural localities in Kharovsky District